The 2023 Eastern Washington Eagles football team will represent Eastern Washington University as a member of the Big Sky Conference during the 2023 NCAA Division I FCS football season. Led by seventh-year head coach Aaron Best, the Eagles played their home games at Roos Field in Cheney, Washington.

Previous season

The Eagles finished the 2022 season with an overall record of 3–8 and a mark of 2–6 in conference play to place in a tie for seventh in the Big Sky.

Schedule

References

Eastern Washington
Eastern Washington Eagles football seasons
Eastern Washington Eagles football